The Bishoprics, etc., in West Indies Act 1842 (5 & 6 Vict. c. 4) was an Act of Parliament in the United Kingdom, which received the Royal Assent on 23 March 1842 and was repealed in 1971.

It provided for the West Indies to be divided up into three or more bishoprics, rather than the two previously provided for. This allowed the establishment of the Diocese of Antigua in 1842, in addition to the two dioceses created in 1824, the Diocese of Jamaica and the Diocese of Barbados. The Act also empowered the bishops to appoint archdeacons, and for the Treasury to pay £6,300 to support the establishment. The Act was repealed by the Statute Law (Repeals) Act 1971, having since become obsolete.

References

The companion to the British almanac, for the year 1843, London, 1843, p. 129.
Chronological table of the statutes; HMSO, London. 1993. 

1842 in British law
United Kingdom Acts of Parliament 1842
Anglican Church in the Caribbean
Christianity and law in the 19th century
British West Indies
Repealed United Kingdom Acts of Parliament
Anglican bishops in the Caribbean by diocese
1842 in the Caribbean
1842 in Christianity
Law about religion in the United Kingdom